Akilah Faizah Weber (born July 2, 1978) is an American politician and physician serving in the California State Assembly from the 79th district, which includes parts of eastern San Diego, and all of La Mesa, El Cajon, Lemon Grove, and La Presa. She is the daughter of California Secretary of State Shirley Weber, whom she succeeded in the Assembly after winning a special election in 2021.

Early life and education 
Weber was born and raised in Oak Park, San Diego. She earned a Bachelor of Science degree in biology from Xavier University of Louisiana and a Doctor of Medicine from the University of Rochester Medical Center.

Career 
After graduating from medical school, Weber completed a residency at the John H. Stroger Jr. Hospital of Cook County and a pediatric and adolescent gynecology fellowship at the Cincinnati Children's Hospital Medical Center. Weber is an OBGYN at Rady Children's Hospital.

In 2018, Weber was elected to the La Mesa City Council.

Weber was elected to the Assembly in a special election on April 6, 2021, to fill the vacancy of her mother, Shirley Weber, who resigned to become the Secretary of State of California. She was subsequently sworn in on April 19, 2021.

References

External links
Join California Akilah Weber

1978 births
20th-century African-American people
20th-century African-American women
21st-century African-American women
21st-century American physicians
21st-century American politicians
21st-century American women physicians
21st-century American women politicians
African-American city council members in California
African-American state legislators in California
African-American women in politics
African-American women physicians
Living people
Democratic Party members of the California State Assembly
People from La Mesa, California
Physicians from California
Politicians from San Diego
University of Rochester alumni
Women city councillors in California
Women state legislators in California
Xavier University of Louisiana alumni